Montgardin is a commune in the Hautes-Alpes department in southeastern France.

Population

See also
Communes of the Hautes-Alpes department

References

Communes of Hautes-Alpes